Palau de Gel, is an arena in Barcelona, Catalonia, Spain, belonging to FC Barcelona. The 1,256 seating capacity arena is home to the ice hockey division of FC Barcelona. It is located between Mini Estadi and the Camp Nou, few meters north of the Palau Blaugrana.

History
Palau de Gel was opened on 23 October 1971, along with the Palau Blaugrana. It was designed by architects Francesc Cavaller and Josep Soteras. The arena hosted several international ice hockey and figure skating tournaments.

Palau de Gel has also been the scene of a World Fencing Championship and two World Roller Hockey category C championships. During the 1992 Summer Olympics, the indoor arena has served as a warm-up area for several sports including judo, taekwondo and roller hockey.

See also
 FC Barcelona (Main body and football club)
 FC Barcelona Ice Hockey

References

External links
Palau de Gel at fcbarcelona.com

FC Barcelona
Sports venues in Barcelona
Indoor arenas in Catalonia
Indoor ice hockey venues in Spain
Buildings and structures completed in 1971